Love Backed by Force is the sole studio album by British post-punk band Tronics, released in 1980 by record label Alien.

Reception 

Fact called it a "bizarre, brilliant DIY record".

References

External links 

 

1980 albums
Tronics albums